Pattie Ruffner Jacobs (sometimes spelled Patti or Patty; October 2, 1875 – December 22, 1935) was an American suffragist from Birmingham, Alabama. She was inducted into the Alabama Women's Hall of Fame in 1978.

Life
Pattie Ruffner was born October 2, 1875, in West Virginia; she died December 22, 1935. She was educated at Ward's Seminary in Nashville, Tennessee, but was unable to continue her studies during the economic crisis of the 1890s. Her parents' marriage dissolved during that period and Pattie moved with her mother to Birmingham to stay with an older sister's family. 

Ruffner married Birmingham businessman Solon Jacobs and took advantage of his means to travel and to enroll in voice classes in New York City. Over time, she became more politically active in the swirl of Progressivism which was reshaping Birmingham as a New South city of industry. Jacobs joined the fight against child labor, convict leasing, and prostitution which were all endemic in the Birmingham District. She was an active member of the Salvation Army and the Jefferson County Anti-Tuberculosis Association. Her increasing national standing led to her participation in the campaign for the sale of Liberty Bonds during World War I.

It was after several failed efforts toward improving public schools that Jacobs concluded that women's suffrage was necessary to achieve social reforms through the political process. She founded the Birmingham Equal Suffrage Association in 1910, followed by the Alabama Equal Suffrage Association a year later. In 1913, Jacobs spoke on behalf of Southern women's suffragists at the Annual Convention of the National Woman Suffrage Association in Washington D. C. 

When speaking before the United States House of Representatives in 1915, Jacobs invoked the legacy of white women who had proved their "worthiness and trustworthiness" through their loyalty to the South "50 years ago"—alluding to white women's continued allegiance to the Confederacy in 1865, the year of the end of the Civil War and the abolition of slavery. Metaphorically standing on the shoulders of these women, Jacobs argued to her fellow Democrats in the audience that "in my own State of Alabama there are 142,000 more white women than negro women so that if the wish of the southern people is to maintain white supremacy, according to Chief Justice Walter Clark of North Carolina, the white women of these States must at least be elevated to the same political plane as the negro men." 

Jacobs and her colleagues nearly succeeded in putting a statewide suffrage referendum on the ballot in 1915, but opponents played up fears that giving women the vote would increase the political power of African Americans. The AESA then turned its efforts toward promoting a national suffrage amendment.

Jacobs was elected as an officer in the National Equal Suffrage Association in 1915. After the passage of the 19th Amendment, Jacobs led the transition of her local organizations into Leagues of Women Voters. She also became national secretary for the National League of Women Voters.

Jacobs led efforts toward other socially-progressive laws as well, such as a failed attempt to establish an 8-hour work day. Presidents Herbert Hoover and Franklin Roosevelt recognized her leadership with appointments to various commissions, such as the Consumer Advisory Board of the National Recovery Administration and as a spokeswoman for the Tennessee Valley Authority.  In 1933 she was the first woman appointed to the Democratic National Committee from Alabama, a position she held until her death two years later.

Jacobs is buried in Birmingham's Elmwood Cemetery.

References

Further reading
 Wheeler, Marjorie Spruill (1993) New Women of the New South: The Leaders of the Woman Suffrage Movement in the Southern States. Oxford University Press. 
 Goodrich, Gillian (January 1978) "Romance and Reality: The Birmingham Suffragists 1892-1920." Journal of Birmingham Historical Society. No. 5, pp. 4–21.
 Thomas, Mary Martha, editor (1995) Stepping Out of the Shadows: Alabama Women, 1819–1990. Tuscaloosa: University of Alabama Press. 
 Dalyrymple, Dolly (April 30, 1930) "Mrs. Solon Jacobs Will Represent Alabama at Suffrage Annual Anniversary." The Birmingham News
 "Funeral Is Held for Mrs. Jacobs." (December 24, 1935) The Birmingham Post.
 "Suffragists Urged to Worry Congress: 335 Delegates to Washington Convention Settling Down to Real Business." (December 2, 1913) The New York Times.
 Gallitz, Shenandoah (2005) "Bossie O'Brien Hundley and the Alabama Equal Suffrage Association's Campaign for Women's Suffrage, 1914-1915".

External links

Patti Ruffner Jacobs at Encyclopedia of Alabama

1875 births
1935 deaths
American suffragists
American women's rights activists
Activists from Birmingham, Alabama
Burials at Elmwood Cemetery (Birmingham, Alabama)
Alabama suffrage
People from Malden, West Virginia
Activists from West Virginia
Ruffner family